Die Sonnenbrucks is an East German film. It was released in 1951.

External links
 

1951 films
East German films
1950s German-language films
Films directed by Georg C. Klaren
German black-and-white films
1950s German films